Frank Lorimer Mayo (June 28, 1889 – July 9, 1963) was an American actor. He appeared in 310 films between 1911 and 1949.

Biography

He was born in New York City, the son of actor Frank M. Mayo, and he died in Laguna Beach, California, from a heart attack. He was married to actress Dagmar Godowsky from 1921 to 1926. The marriage was annulled in August 1926 on the ground that Mayo had another wife. Mayo was buried at the Forest Lawn, Hollywood Hills Cemetery in Los Angeles.

Selected filmography

 The Red Circle (1915)
 Shadows (1916)
 Sold at Auction (1917)
 The Bronze Bride (1917)
 Easy Money (1917)
 Betsy Ross (1917)
 The Burglar (1917)
 The Purple Lily (1918)
 The Interloper (1918)
 Tinsel (1918)
 Lasca (1919)
 The Rough Neck (1919)
 The Girl in Number 29 (1920)
 Hitchin' Posts (1920)
 Burnt Wings (1920)
 Through Eyes of Men (1920)
 Colorado (1921)
 The Fighting Lover (1921)
 Dr. Jim (1921)
 The Magnificent Brute (1921)
 The Blazing Trail (1921)
 Tiger True (1921)
 Go Straight (1921)
 Across the Dead-Line (1922)
 The Altar Stairs (1922)
 Wolf Law (1922)
 The First Degree (1923)
 Souls for Sale (1923)
 Six Days (1923)
 Wild Oranges (1924)
 The Shadow of the Desert (1924)
 The Plunderer (1924)
 The Triflers (1924)
 Is Love Everything? (1924)
The Price She Paid (1924)
 Barriers Burned Away (1925)
 Women and Gold (1925)
 The Unknown Lover (1925)
 Passionate Youth (1925)
 Then Came the Woman (1926)
 Range Law (1931)
 Chinatown After Dark (1931)
 The Hawk (1931)
 Alias – the Bad Man (1931)
 Hell's Headquarters (1932)
 The Magnificent Brute (1936)
 The Oklahoma Kid (1939) as Land Agent (uncredited)
 The Roaring Twenties (1939) (uncredited)
 The Wagons Roll at Night (1941)
 Highway West (1941)
 Lady Gangster (1942)
 Yankee Doodle Dandy (1942) as Hotel Clerk (uncredited)
 The Gorilla Man (1943)
 Lake Placid Serenade (1944)
 The Devil's Mask (1946)
 The Strange Mr. Gregory (1946)

References

External links

 

1889 births
1963 deaths
American male film actors
American male silent film actors
20th-century American male actors
Male actors from New York City
Burials at Forest Lawn Memorial Park (Hollywood Hills)
Male Western (genre) film actors